Anastasius Hartmann, born as Joseph Alois Hartmann (* 24. February 1803 in Altwis, Canton Lucerne, Switzerland ; † 24. April 1886 in Kurji in Patna, India ), was a Capuchin, a missionary in India, Titular Bishop and Vicar Apostolic of Patna and Bombay.

Early life and education
He was born in Altwis in 1803, the son of peasants Joseph Hartmann and his wife Barbara Nietlisbach and baptised on the day after his birth in the local parish.

He attended school in Solothurn and entered  the novitiate of the Capuchin Order on 17 September 1821.

Priesthood 
In 1822 he professed his vows and was ordained a priest on September 24, 1825. After ordination, he worked as a chaplain in Luzern, then as novice master and teacher of theology at Fribourg until 1830. In 1839, he was sent to Solothurn to teach philosophy. During his teaching days, he started to feel a strong desire to go to the overseas missions. Permission was granted him to go as a missionary only after much hesitation from his superiors.

In September 1841, Hartmann left Switzerland and traveled to Rome on foot. In 1843, he was chosen to go with the Mission to Agra in India. After five months, he was reassigned to head the mission station in the town of Gwalior, in what is now Madhya Pradesh.

Episcopate 
In September 1845, Pope Gregory XVI. made him the Vicar Apostolic of Patna and Titular Bishop of Derbe, with episcopal ordination at Akbar's Church on 15 March 1846 by the local Apostolic Vicar Alessandro Borghi (bishop), Hartmanns bishopric consisted of seven parishes that were supervised by four priests.  He worked with great zeal and under difficult conditions.

On July 9, 1854 Anastasius Hartmann became Vicar Apostolic of Bombay.

Death 
Bishop Anastasius Hartmann died on 24 April 1866 in his residence at St. Joseph's Orphanage at Kurji,(near Patna), from cholera . In life he had a reputation of holiness.  He was buried in the (old) Cathedral of Patna. Bishop Anastasius Hartmann was declared venerable on 21 December 1998 by Pope John Paul II.

See also 
List of saints of India
List of Servants of God

References 

1803 births
1866 deaths
People from Lucerne
Swiss Christian monks
Capuchin missionaries in India
19th-century Roman Catholic titular bishops
Deaths from cholera
Servants of God
Order of Friars Minor Capuchin
19th-century Roman Catholic bishops in India